How to Plan an Orgy in a Small Town is a 2015 Canadian sex comedy film directed by Jeremy Lalonde.

Plot
The film stars Jewel Staite as Cassie Cranston, a newspaper sex columnist returning to her hometown for her mother's funeral, for the first time since being slut-shamed by her high school classmates who caught her trying to lose her virginity. In trouble with her publisher because many of the sex stories she has written about were actually fictional, and with her former friends and neighbours because she has often written about them as yokels and rubes, she tries to square the circle by challenging the town to plan an orgy to prove that they are not as provincial as she has depicted them, in turn giving her the opportunity to write a new true story.

Release and awards
The film premiered at the 2015 Atlantic Film Festival. It was later screened at the 2016 Canadian Film Festival, where it won the awards for Best Feature, Best Costume Design and Best Ensemble Cast. On May 13, 2015, the film was released in select theaters and on demand in Canada by Northern Banner and in the United States by Gravitas Ventures.

Cast

Reception
The film has a user rating of 5.5 due to mixed critic reviews on IMDb.

References

External links
 
 
 

2015 films
2015 comedy films
2015 independent films
2010s sex comedy films
Canadian independent films
Canadian sex comedy films
English-language Canadian films
2010s English-language films
Films directed by Jeremy Lalonde
Films set in Canada
Films shot in Ontario
2010s Canadian films